Maria Gstöttner is an Austrian football striker, currently playing for SV Neulengbach in Austria's Frauenliga. She was the league's top scorer for five seasons in a row between 2001 and 2005.

She is a member of the Austrian national team

Titles
 Austrian league: 2003, 2004, 2005, 2006, 2007, 2008, 2009, 2010, 2011
 Austrian cup: 2003, 2004, 2005, 2006, 2007, 2008, 2009, 2010, 2011

References

1984 births
Living people
Austrian women's footballers
Austria women's international footballers
SV Neulengbach (women) players
Women's association football forwards
ÖFB-Frauenliga players
People from Sankt Pölten
Footballers from Lower Austria